Ust-Shonosha is a rural locality (a settlement) and the administrative center of Ust-Shonoshskoye Rural Settlement of Velsky District, Arkhangelsk Oblast, Russia. The population was 1,125 as of 2014. There are 32 streets.

Geography 
Ust-Shonosha is located on the Vel River, 59 km northwest of Velsk (the district's administrative centre) by road. Ust-Shonosha is the nearest rural locality.

References 

Rural localities in Velsky District